Dirt track racing is a type of auto racing performed on oval tracks throughout the United Kingdom. If the number of tracks is any indication of popularity, dirt track racing is the most popular auto racing sport in Britain, as dirt ovals outnumber all other types of tracks combined. Tracks are also used for the motorcycle sport of Speedway and other motorcycle track racing events.

The majority of these tracks are used for Autograss racing.

Venues

England

Northern Ireland

Wales

External links
https://www.national-autograss.com/
https://www.speedwaygb.co.uk/
http://www.brisca.com/Home/

United Kingdom